The Death Duel is a 1972 Taiwanese and Hong Kong film about the Ching Wu Association and the Japanese-rule era.

References

1972 films
Taiwanese action films
Hong Kong action films
1970s action films
Mandarin-language films
1970s Hong Kong films